Philip Méheux,  (born 17 September 1941) is an English cinematographer. 

He has often worked with directors John Mackenzie, Martin Campbell and Raja Gosnell. 

He was nominated for the BAFTA Award for Best Cinematography for the 2006 James Bond film Casino Royale. 

He is a member of the British Academy of Film and Television Arts, and served as president of the British Society of Cinematographers between 2002 and 2006.

Filmography

References

External links 

1941 births
English cinematographers
Living people
People from Sidcup
British people of French descent